Round Trip is the third studio album by power pop/new wave band The Knack that was released by Capitol Records in 1981. It received generally unfavorable critical reviews, and stalled at #93 in the Billboard 200. It contained the single "Pay The Devil (Ooo, Baby, Ooo)" (which hit #67 on the Billboard Hot 100). "Boys Go Crazy" was issued as the single from the album in Australia.  It was also issued as a follow up single to "Pay the Devil" in the U.S. and was expected to be "chart bound" on the Hot 100, but it did not chart.  The band broke up a few months after its release, with their label dropping them due to failed expectations. They remained disbanded until a 1986 reunion.

Overview and reviews
Round Trip was their third album, and it was produced by Jack Douglas. The album was generally critically panned at the time of its release, however, some critics have subsequently been more positive. Steve "Spaz" Schnee of Allmusic called it "brilliant" and stated that it was better than the previous two albums. Darren Robbins of the pop culture review website The Zeitgeisty Report has called the album a "masterpiece" and "possibly the most underrated album of all-time".

Critic David Fricke of Rolling Stone gave a generally positive review, commenting:

The New York Times was less generous. The Times, while calling the album "well-crafted" said that "with its careful harmonies, psychedelic sound effects and jazzy touches, [the album] tries to conceal the utter fatuity of its songs under studio cosmetics," and took the album as proof that The Knack was a "one-hit wonder."

"Boys Go Crazy" was included in the 1992 EMI Music compilation album My Sharona. The songs "Another Lousy Day in Paradise," "Africa," "Sweet Dreams," "Just Wait and See," and "Pay the Devil (Ooo, Baby, Ooo)" were incorporated into The Retrospective: The Best of the Knack, which was released by Capitol Records on November 16, 1992. Songs "Another Lousy Day in Paradise," "Just Wait and See" and "Pay the Devil (Ooo, Baby, Ooo)" were included in Very Best of the Knack, released by Rhino Records on May 19, 1998. "Boys Go Crazy" and "Pay the Devil (Ooo, Baby, Ooo)" were included in Best of the Knack, released by Collectables Records on August 17, 1999.  A live version of "Art War" was included on Havin’ a Rave-Up! Live In Los Angeles, 1978, a live album from the Knack's 1978 concerts in Los Angeles prior to the release of "Get the Knack."

Classic Rock History critic Skip Anderson rated "Boys Go Crazy" as the Knack's 8th best song and felt it should have been the lead single in the U.S. rather than "Pay the Devil". Record World called it "a straight-ahead rocker" in which "Doug Fieger's emphatic vocal rides a racehorse rhythm."

Track listing

Instead of the conventional "side 1" and "side 2", the sides of the original vinyl issue were labeled as "there" and "back".

All songs are by Berton Averre and Doug Fieger unless noted

There
 "Radiating Love"                                           4:42
 "Soul Kissin'"                                             3:40
 "Africa"                                                   4:34
 "She Likes the Beat" (Doug Fieger)                         3:04
 "Just Wait and See"                                        3:04
 "We Are Waiting" (Doug Fieger, John Corey)                                          4:25

Back
 "Boys Go Crazy" (Doug Fieger)                              2:48
 "Lil' Cals Big Mistake"                                    3:45
 "Sweet Dreams" (Doug Fieger)                               3:37
 "Another Lousy Day in Paradise"                            3:34
 "Pay the Devil (Ooo, Baby, Ooo)" (Berton Averre)       4:13
 "Art War"                                                  4:13

Personnel
Doug Fieger – lead vocals, rhythm guitar
Berton Averre – lead guitar, keyboards, vocals
Prescott Niles – bass
Bruce Gary – drums and percussion

See also
1981 in music

References

External links
The Knack website

1981 albums
Capitol Records albums
The Knack albums
Albums produced by Jack Douglas (record producer)